The Robe is a 1942 novel about the crucifixion of Jesus.

The Robe may also refer to:
Film
 The Robe (film), a 1953 Biblical epic film adaptation of the above-mentioned book
Music
 The Robe (album), a 1997 album by the hard rock band Ten
 The Robe (EP), a 1997 EP by Ten, the title song on Ten's eponymous album

See also
 Robe (disambiguation)